Nia Khorram (also Romanized as Nīā Khorram) is a village in Khanandabil-e Gharbi Rural District, in the Central District of Khalkhal County, Ardabil Province, Iran. At the 2006 census, its population was 127 in 28 families.

References 

Tageo

Towns and villages in Khalkhal County